Oracle bones, also known as dragon bones, are pieces of turtle shell or bone used in ancient Chinese divination.

Dragon bone(s) may also refer to:

Fiction
 Dragon Bone, a character from the manga Majin Bone
 Dragon Bones (Briggs novel), a 2002 fantasy novel by Patricia Briggs, first instalment of her Hurog series
 Dragon Bones (See novel), a 2003 mystery novel by Lisa See, third instalment of her Red Princess series

Paleontology
 Dinosaur bones, thought then to be the remains of dragons
 Dragon Bone Hill, hill in Zhoukoudian, a Chinese archeological site near Beijing, place of the discovery of the Peking Man
 Longgupo (Dragon Bone Slope), a Chinese archeological site near Chongqing where Wushan Man was discovered

Others
 'Dragon Bone Hill', a track from the 1994 album Goodbye to the Age of Steam from band 'Big Big Train'
 Dragon Bones, a 2D skeletal animation solution of the Starling Framework
 Euphorbia lactea, a tropical poisonous shrub, widely grown as an ornamental plant
 Heroes of Might and Magic: Quest for the Dragon Bone Staff, a 2001 video game
 Longgu (Dragon Bone), an ingredient used in Traditional Chinese medicine; see dragon bones